Astarte elliptica, or the "elliptical astarte", is a species of bivalve mollusc in the family Astartidae. It can be found along the Atlantic coast of North America, ranging from Greenland to Massachusetts.

References

Astartidae
Molluscs of the Atlantic Ocean
Bivalves described in 1827